The 1971 All-East football team consists of American football players chosen by various selectors as the best players at each position among the Eastern colleges and universities during the 1971 NCAA University Division football season.

Offense

Quarterback
 John Hufnagel, Penn State (AP-1, UPI-1)

Running backs
 Ed Marinaro, Cornell (AP-1, UPI-1)
 Lydell Mitchell, Penn State (AP-1, UPI-1)
 Hank Bjorklund, Princeton (AP-1)

Tight end
 Bob Parsons, Penn State (AP-1, UPI-1)

Wide receivers
 Mike Siani, Villanova (AP-1, UPI-1)
 Don Clune, Penn (UPI-1)

Tackles
 David Joyner, Penn State (AP-1, UPI-1)
 Joe Leslie, Dartmouth (AP-1, UPI-1)

Guards
 Bill Singletary, Temple (AP-1, UPI-1)
 B.C. Williams, West Virginia (AP-1, UPI-1)

Center
 Kent Andiorio, Boston College (AP-1)
 Bob Kuziel, Pittsburgh (UPI-1)

Defense

Ends
 Bruce Bannon, Penn State (AP-1, UPI-1)
 Steve Bogosian, Army (AP-1)
 John Roth, Army (UPI-1)

Tackles
 Jeff Yeates, Boston College (AP-1, UPI-1)
 Rick Versocki, Boston University (AP-1)
 Ted Lachowicz, Syracuse (UPI-1)

Linebackers
 John Babinecz, Villanova (AP-1, UPI-1)
 Ralph Cindrich, Pittsburgh (AP-1, UPI-1)
 Charlie Zapiec, Penn State (AP-1, UPI-1)
 Paul Kaliades, Columbia (AP-1)
 Gary Gray, Penn State (UPI-1)

Defensive backs 
 Tom Myers, Syracuse (AP-1, UPI-1)
 Frank Polito, Villanova (AP-1, UPI-1)
 Dave Ignacio, Harvard (AP-1)
 Leon Jenkins, West Virginia (UPI-1)

Key
 AP = Associated Press
 UPI = United Press International

See also
 1971 College Football All-America Team

References

All-Eastern
All-Eastern college football teams